DiGiorgio corporation was a fruit-growing corporation and eventual conglomerate in the 20th century. Once a vast company, owning much of California's central valley farm land, and multibillion-dollar corporation, a massive restructuring in the 1990s limited its breadth. DiGiorgio distributed food products under its White Rose brand name to New York, New Jersey and Connecticut.

Founding

Joseph DiGiorgio (born Giuseppe DiGiorgio, 1874 in Cefalu, Sicily) immigrated to the United States in 1888, becoming a middleman for fruit sales. He founded the Baltimore Fruit Exchange in 1904 on borrowed money and eventually owned fruit exchanges in several major regions of the east coast. In 1911 was able to purchase the Earl Fruit Company, a California shipper to integrate further in the produce chain. In 1919, he bought 5845 acres of land outside Arvin in California's San Joaquin Valley. A year later, DiGiorgio founded DiGiorgio Fruit Co. His success came when he obtained water for the arid California land by drilling wells hundreds of feet deep. By 1929, just ten years after his original land purchase, DiGiorgio's company was the largest fruit-packing plant in the nation.

Growth
The produce grown on the west coast became the main focus of the business. The end of Prohibition in 1933 saw DiGiorgio venture into the winery business, forming Del Vista Wine Co and bulk wine was shipped to the east coast in large tank cars. DiGiorgio was the largest wine producer in the country at that time though wine became a minor part of the corporation later. By 1946, the company occupied  of the San Joaquin Valley as well as land as far north as Washington state, in Marysville and south to the Mexican border. It was the largest grape, plum and pear grower in the world. Its revenue rose from $5.7 million in 1938 to $18.2 million in 1946, with DiGiorgio and his family owning 59% of the stock.

Early setbacks
The shrinking and increasingly saline water table eventually forced DiGiorgio Co. to request federal irrigation water.

Ernesto Galarza also targeted DiGiorgio Co., organizing a strike from 1947 to 1950 and a boycott of the company's products.  The strike lasted 30 months.  DiGiorgio Co. eventually signed a contract with the United Farm Workers in 1966, after another long and highly publicized strike led by Cesar Chavez.

Change in leadership & diversification
Joseph DiGiorgio died in 1951 and his nephew, Robert DiGiorgio rose to leadership, becoming president in 1962.  By 1967, the agricultural portion of the business accounted for less than 2% of revenue and "Fruit" was dropped from the company's name. Its acquisitions included S&W Fine Foods, TreeSweet, White Rose, Serv-A-Portion (distributor of condiment packets for fast food), Los Angeles Drugs, Peter Carando Inc (Italian-style meats),  Sun Aire Airlines and Las Plumas Lumber Co. DiGiorgio also became invested in land development across California. In 1965, assets had reached $82.9 million and sales had passed $100 million. DiGiorgio Co. ranked 9th in rate of sales growth in the nation at that time.  Its products and services ranged from grocery distribution, fruit juices, campers, lumber, housing components, pharmaceuticals, wine and, of course, fruit. Modest exports were mainly to Europe and Japan.

Decline
By the late 1970s, DiGiorgio's sales had reached $1 billion. The company was seen to lack focus due to the large scope of operations and the recession of the 1970s had negative effects on the camper and lumber businesses. Peripheral companies were sold off. Robert Di Giorgio eventually stepped down as chairperson in 1982 turning the company over to Peter Scott, former Chief Financial Officer.

The late '80s saw hostile takeover attempts by the Gabelli Group Inc. Restructuring began in 1984. Sun Aire was sold to SkyWest Airlines; TreeSweet, Allied Distributing Co., Los Angeles Drug Co., Serv-A-Portion and much of the real estate outside of Borrego Springs was sold as well. However, in doing so, it left DiGiorgio only two lines of business: food processing/distribution and building materials. In 1988, management enacted a $70 million, $21-a-share buyback offer. Trial lawyer and New Jersey native Arther Goldberg attempted to gain control of the remains, interested in the White Rose Company. By 1990 he had taken control of the company, moving the headquarters from San Francisco to Somerset, New Jersey.  All but White Rose division were eventually sold off by 1994.

Legacy
Di Giorgio Elementary School founded in 1897 and is the oldest school in Arvin. Following the burning of the original schoolhouse, agricultural entrepreneur Joseph Di Giorgio would donate $150,000 and 40 acres of land on Christmas Eve, 1945. Rockpile School would then change its name to Di Giorgio School to honor the gift.

The White Rose Company, successor to the Di Giorgio Company, changed hands and finally declared bankruptcy in late 2013.

However, DiGiorgio a town in the California San Joaquin Valley still bears the name of the once vast farming empire. The DiGiorgio family donated money to Cefalu, Sicily, which contains a "DiGiorgio Technical Institute" and "Plaza DiGiorgio".

References
 Ruth Teiser, The DiGiorgios: From Fruit Merchants to Corporate Innovators. The Regents of the University of California.  1986

Wineries in California
Agriculture companies of the United States